An Island Comedy is a 1911 silent film short comedy directed by Ashley Miller. It starred Marc McDermott and Miriam Nesbitt. It was produced by the Edison Company and distributed through General Film Company.

Cast
Marc McDermott - Mr. Schuyler
Miriam Nesbitt - Miriam
William Wadsworth - Miriam's Father
Yale Boss - Miriam's Little Brother

References

External links
 An Island Comedy at IMDb.com

1911 films
American silent short films
American black-and-white films
1910s American films